"Put It On" is a song recorded by American rapper Big L, and features American rapper Kid Capri. The track was produced by Buckwild for L's debut studio album, Lifestylez ov da Poor and Dangerous (1995). The song was written by Big L, Roy Ayers and Anthony Best. The song was released on November 13, 1994 as the first single from the album through Columbia Records/Sony Music Entertainment.

In an interview with HipHop DX, Lord Finesse described "Put It On":
[Columbia Records] wanted something with a hook that would be kinda catchy, and something they could get radio play with. Like, everything [L] did was dark, and it was gangsta, and it was…what was the [popular style at the time]? Horror-core. So they needed something bright, something friendly. And “Put It On” just matched everything perfect . . . “Put it on,” the slang…was like… “do your thing.” “Put it on Big L, put it on…” [meaning] you gotta do your thing, you gotta represent.
It was also sampled in dubstep artist Datsik's song "Firepower".

Track listing

Charts

References

External links
Put It On Single at Discogs
Put It On Lyrics at Genius

1994 singles
1994 songs
Big L songs
Columbia Records singles
Songs written by Buckwild (music producer)
Song recordings produced by Buckwild (music producer)
Music videos directed by Brian Luvar